Aleck Ellison "Alex" Irvin (April 5, 1890 – April 25, 1971) was a Canadian professional ice hockey player. He played with the Vancouver Millionaires and the Victoria Aristocrats of the Pacific Coast Hockey Association.

Alex Irvin was an older brother of Hockey Hall of Fame member Dick Irvin, and although the brothers were born in Hamilton, Ontario they both came up through the hockey ranks in Winnipeg where they played for the Winnipeg Monarchs. On March 10, 1915 the Monarchs captured the Allan Cup as Canadian amateur champions by defeating the Melville Millionaires 4 goals to 2, with Alex Irvin captaining the team.

References

Notes

1890 births
1971 deaths
Canadian ice hockey defencemen
Ice hockey people from Ontario
Sportspeople from Hamilton, Ontario
Vancouver Millionaires players
Victoria Aristocrats players
Winnipeg Monarchs players